A list of horror films released in 1984.

References

Sources

 

 

 

 

  

 
Lists of horror films by year
Horror